The Buddhist Faith Fellowship is a non-denominational Buddhist Church, located in Middletown, Connecticut, situated in Middlesex County. It was founded in 2001. The Fellowship describes itself as an independent American Buddhist church 'tethered to the earliest Buddhist teachings and the spirit of boundless compassion of Shin Buddhism.

Bibliography 
 Payne, Richard K. (2009). Path No Path. Numata Center for Buddhist Translation & Rese; 1 edition. 
 Petersson, Margaret (2013) I Stumbled Upon a Jewel: A Collection of Essays by a Lay Sangha. AuthorHouse. .
 Hadley, Barbara (April 2012). The Growth of Buddhism in America. Unity Institute's Lyceum 2011 Spiritual Studies from a Global Perspective: The Ongoing East -West

References

External links 
 

Buddhist temples in Connecticut
2001 establishments in Connecticut
Buildings and structures in Middletown, Connecticut
Pure Land Buddhism